Shut Out (February 27, 1939 – April 23, 1964) was an American Thoroughbred racehorse.

Background
Shut Out was a chestnut stallion sired by Hall of Famer  Equipoise, the multiple stakes-winning champion his fans called "The Chocolate Soldier."  Shut Out was bred by Greentree Stable in Lexington, Kentucky, owned by Mrs. Payne Whitney (Helen Hay Whitney), who had also bred his dam, Goose Egg, by the French stallion Chicle.

Racing career
The year Shut Out was born, Greentree Stables also produced top runner Devil Diver, who beat Shut Out in the 1941 Hopeful Stakes for 2-year-olds.  Hall of Fame conditioner John Gaver, training for Greentree, gave Eddie Arcaro his choice of Kentucky Derby mounts: Devil Diver or Shut Out.  Arcaro chose Devil Diver, who came in sixth. Shut Out, under jockey Wayne D. Wright, won the race. Arcaro switched mounts for the Belmont Stakes, riding Shut Out to victory.

Shut Out's other main rival that year was Alsab, 1941's U.S. Champion Two-Year-Old Colt.  Alsab also took 1942's three-year-old honors. Yet Shut Out came close to winning the 1942 Triple Crown, losing the Preakness Stakes to Alsab while finishing fifth after a troubled trip. He also won the prestigious Travers Stakes, again under Arcaro. Shut Out held a 3 to 2 margin over Alsab when Alsab finished fourth in his career finale, while Shut Out was third in an overnight handicap in 1944.

Stud record
Shut Out died in 1964 after a respectable career at stud, siring a number of stakes winners for Greentree such as One Hitter.

Pedigree

References
 The History of Thoroughbred Racing in America, by William H.P. Robertson, Bonanza Books, New York

Specific

External links
 Shut Out's pedigree, photo and stats

1939 racehorse births
1964 racehorse deaths
Whitney racehorses
Racehorses trained in the United States
Racehorses bred in Kentucky
Kentucky Derby winners
Thoroughbred family 16-g